The 2001 Bausch & Lomb Championships was a women's tennis tournament played on outdoor clay courts at the Amelia Island Plantation on Amelia Island, Florida in the United States and was part of Tier II of the 2001 WTA Tour. The tournament ran from April 9 through April 15, 2001. Sixth-seeded Amélie Mauresmo won the singles title.

Finals

Singles

 Amélie Mauresmo defeated  Amanda Coetzer 6–4, 7–5
 It was Mauresmo's 3rd title of the year and the 6th of her career.

Doubles

 Conchita Martínez /  Patricia Tarabini defeated  Martina Navratilova /  Arantxa Sánchez-Vicario 6–4, 6–2
 It was Martínez's only title of the year and the 42nd of her career. It was Tarabini's 1st title of the year and the 14th of her career.

External links
 ITF tournament edition details

Bausch and Lomb Championships
Amelia Island Championships
Bausch & Lomb Championships
Bausch & Lomb Championships
Bausch & Lomb Championships